Armen Andranik Shahgeldyan (born 28 August 1973) is an Armenian football manager and former player who is the manager of Armenian club Alashkert-2. He played as a striker for the Armenia national team, and finished his career for Armenian Premier League club FC Mika.

Armen debuted for Armenia in 1992, when Armenia played its first international match after gaining independence in a friendly. He has been a member of the national team on and off throughout his career, and has scored six goals in 53 caps. Shahgeldyan was elected twice as the Armenian Footballer of the Year: in 1993 and 2006.

He was the head coach of Mika Yerevan in the 2010 and 2011 seasons of Armenian Premier League.

Club career
At age 16, Armen was in Ararat Yerevan, the color he protected for six years. As part of Ararat, the club won the Armenian Premier League twice in 1993 and 1995 and the Armenian Cup thrice in 1993, 1994, 1995, as well as Shahgeldyan was voted the Armenian Footballer of the Year in 1993.

In 1996, the transition took place in the camp of a rival of the time, to whom was Cilicia, then known as Pyunik Yerevan. Here Armen spent only one season, during which he became the 1996–97 Armenian Premier League champion and 1996–97 Armenian Cup and 1997 Armenian Supercup finalist.

The next two seasons he spent abroad, try his hand at Ukrainian and Israeli championships, but neither the first nor the second show itself could not. Followed after the first return to his homeland. In 1998, he played for FC Yerevan, which included the 1998 Armenian Premier League bronze medalist and 1998 Armenian Cup finalist. At the end of the Armenian Premier League, he receives an offer from a Swiss club Lausanne Sports, which is contracting. For three seasons, he played for the club. Shahgeldyan appeared in 26 games and scored 6 goals. The situation was similar in Dynamo Moscow, where over half of the season Shahgeldyan appeared on the field just twice.

In 2001, the second return home occurred for Shahgeldyan. Armen was home to Mika Yerevan. After crossing, half of the season took place in Cyprus.

In 2004, again in Mika, for which conducts a full season, playing in 21 games and scoring 12 goals in them (5th place in the season). At the end of the year was the last departure to a foreign club, Al Ahed, where spent the beginning of the season and then once again moved to the Mika. The last two and a half seasons of his playing career spent in the Ashtarak club, which included two Armenian Cup in 2005, 2006 and one Armenian Supercup in 2006 and recognized as the Armenian Footballer of the Year for a second time in 2006 and the best forward in 2005.

International career
Armen debuted in the Armenia national football team first team in 1992. It was the first match of the team since the independence of Armenia. The match was a friendly against the national team of Moldova, and ended with a score of a zero tie. From now until the end of his playing career in 2007, Armen constantly received calls in the national team. During this time, he played in 53 games, 8th place or all time, and scored 6 goals, 7th place or all time.

Managerial career
Shahgeldyan graduated from the high school of coaches in Moscow. Since 2008, the head of FC Mika-2. In the first 2010 Armenian Premier League match of the season, the club was fined 50,000 drams marked "For constant interference in the match referee from the head coach," Mickey-2 "while playing his charges with Shirak FC-2." Due to the unsatisfactory results of Mika, head coach Armen Adamyan left. In the place the head coach took Armen Shahgeldyan. With the advent Shahgeldyan, results changed. The team often began the trick, but it was not enough to win medals. The new season again entrusted Shahgeldyan. The team was periodically thrown to the side. Therefore, the team managed to win the Cup after a long period. However, the results of the championship outweighed Cups to Shahgeldyan and he had to leave. On the occasion of the removal of the head coach of Mika from office, the vacancy was offered Markarova.

Personal life
Shahgeldyan has a son, Andranik, who is also a football player. Andranik played for FC Mika in the first team as a forward during the time Armen was head coach. After the departure of his father as head coach, he went to Ulisses FC for the end of the season.

Career statistics

International

Honours

Player
Ararat Yerevan
 Armenian Premier League: 1993, 1995
 Armenian Cup: 1993, 1994, 1995

Pyunik Yerevan
 Armenian Premier League: 1996–97
 Armenian Cup runner-up: 1996–97
 Armenian Supercup runner-up: 1997

FC Yerevan
 Armenian Cup runner-up: 1998

Mika Yerevan
 Armenian Cup: 2005, 2006
 Armenian Supercup: 2006; runner-up: 2004, 2007

Lausanne-Sport
 Swiss Cup: 1998, 1999

Individual
 Armenian Footballer of the Year: 1993, 2006
 Best Forward of Armenia: 2004, 2005
 Lebanese Premier League Team of the Season: 2004–05

Manager
Mika
 Armenian Cup: 2011

References

External links
 
 armfootball.tripod.com
 
 

1973 births
Living people
Sportspeople from Yerevan
Association football forwards
Association football midfielders
Armenian footballers
Armenia international footballers
Armenian expatriate footballers
FC Ararat Yerevan players
FC Pyunik players
FC Chornomorets Odesa players
Hapoel Petah Tikva F.C. players
FC Lausanne-Sport players
FC Dynamo Moscow players
FC Mika players
Nea Salamis Famagusta FC players
Al Ahed FC players
Expatriate footballers in Ukraine
Armenian expatriate sportspeople in Ukraine
Expatriate footballers in Israel
Armenian expatriate sportspeople in Israel
Expatriate footballers in Switzerland
Armenian expatriate sportspeople in Switzerland
Expatriate footballers in Russia
Armenian expatriate sportspeople in Russia
Expatriate footballers in Cyprus
Armenian expatriate sportspeople in Cyprus
Expatriate footballers in Lebanon
Armenian expatriate sportspeople in Lebanon
Armenian Premier League players
Swiss Super League players
Russian Premier League players
Ukrainian Premier League players
Cypriot First Division players
Lebanese Premier League players
Armenian football managers
FC Mika managers
Soviet Armenians
Soviet footballers